Rhapsody is an album by American jazz pianist Ahmad Jamal featuring performances recorded in 1965 and released in 1966 on the Cadet label.

Critical reception
In his review for Allmusic, Scott Yanow calls it "decent music, but not quite essential".

Track listing
 "I Hear a Rhapsody" (Dick Gasparre, George Fragos, Jack Baker) – 4:45   
 "This Could Be the Start of Something" (Steve Allen) – 3:35   
 "Then I'll Be Tired Of You" (Arthur Schwartz, E. Y. Harburg) – 3:52   
 "Effendi" (McCoy Tyner) – 4:06   
 "Invitation" (Bronisław Kaper, Paul Francis Webster) – 3:00   
 "The Shadow of Your Smile" (Johnny Mandel, Webster) – 2:58   
 "Strange" (John La Touche, Marvin Fisher) – 3:06   
 "You Can Be Sure" (Joe Kennedy) – 3:48   
 "Concern" (Ahmad Jamal) – 5:57

Personnel
Ahmad Jamal – piano, arranger
Jamil Nasser – bass
Vernel Fournier – drums
Unnamed fifteen-piece orchestra of violins, violas and cellos arranged by Joe Kennedy  (tracks 1, 3, 6 & 8)

References 

Cadet Records albums
Ahmad Jamal albums
1966 albums